Departure Lake is a lake in geographic Haggart Township in Unorganized North Cochrane District, Cochrane District, in Northeastern Ontario, Canada.

The primary inflow, at the south, and outflow, at the north, is the Poplar Rapids River, which flows via the Mattagami River and the Moose River to James Bay.

There is a picnic area on the north shore of the lake at the end of North Access Road, the road that leads south from Highway 11 at community of Departure Lake.

See also
List of lakes in Ontario

References

Lakes of Cochrane District